A Community Speaks is a 2004 feature-length documentary about modern-day land stewardship. The documentary was produced and directed by Bruce Campbell and his wife, Ida Gearon.

Overview
The documentary was shot in Oregon and was Campbell's second directorial effort, following the 2002 short documentary Fanalysis.

Starring
Bruce Campbell as himself
Ida Gearon as herself

See also
Fanalysis (2002)

References

External links

2004 films
American documentary films
2004 documentary films
Documentary films about environmental issues
Films directed by Bruce Campbell
2000s English-language films
2000s American films